The Musical Fund Society is one of the oldest musical societies in the United States founded in February 1820 by Benjamin Carr, Raynor Taylor, George Schetky and Benjamin Cross, and the painter Thomas Sully. Its first public concert on April 22, 1821 and featured Beethoven’s 2nd Symphony.

Musical Fund Hall 
The Musical Fund Hall, 808 Locust Street in Philadelphia, is a landmark home of the society.

References

External links
The Musical Fund Society
University of Pennsylvania’s Rare Book and Manuscript Library

Organizations based in Philadelphia
Culture of Philadelphia
University of Pennsylvania
Organizations established in 1820
1820 establishments in Pennsylvania